Criuleni is a city in Moldova, seat of the Criuleni District. The city administers two villages, Ohrincea and Zolonceni.

International relations

Twin towns — Sister cities 
Ungheni is twinned with:

  Orăștie, Romania

References

Cities and towns in Moldova
Orgeyevsky Uyezd
Criuleni District